Patrick Bihetoué Arnaud Malo (born 18 February 1992) is a Burkinabé professional footballer who plays as a left-back for Kuwaiti club Qadsia SC and the Burkina Faso national team.

Career
Born in Ouagadougou, Malo has played for USFA, SOA, JS Kabylie, Smouha, Wadi Degla, ASEC Mimosas and Hassania Agadir.

Malo made his international debut for the Burkina Faso national team in 2015, and was named in the squad for the 2017 Africa Cup of Nations.

Personal life
Malo's father, Kamou, was a former manager of Burkina Faso.

References

1992 births
Living people
Burkinabé footballers
Association football fullbacks
Burkina Faso international footballers
2017 Africa Cup of Nations players
2021 Africa Cup of Nations players
US des Forces Armées players
Société Omnisports de l'Armée players
JS Kabylie players
Smouha SC players
Qadsia SC players
Wadi Degla SC players
ASEC Mimosas players
Hassania Agadir players
Burkinabé Premier League players
Ligue 1 (Ivory Coast) players
Algerian Ligue Professionnelle 1 players
Egyptian Premier League players
Kuwait Premier League players
Burkinabé expatriate footballers
Burkinabé expatriate sportspeople in Ivory Coast
Expatriate footballers in Ivory Coast
Burkinabé expatriate sportspeople in Algeria
Expatriate footballers in Algeria
Burkinabé expatriate sportspeople in Egypt
Expatriate footballers in Egypt
Burkinabé expatriate sportspeople in Morocco
Expatriate footballers in Morocco
Expatriate footballers in Kuwait
Burkinabé expatriate sportspeople in Kuwait
21st-century Burkinabé people